The 2013–14 Scottish League Cup was the 68th season of Scotland's second-most prestigious football knockout competition.

Format
The competition is a single elimination knock-out competition. In each round, fixtures are determined by random draw, with the first to third rounds seeded according to last season's league positions (higher 50% of finishers drawn v lower 50% of finishers, alternating which is at home with each tie drawn).

Fixtures are played to a finish, with extra time and then penalties used in the event of draws. The competition is open to all clubs in the Scottish Professional Football League. Clubs involved in European competitions are given a bye to the third round in order to avoid congestion of fixtures.

First round: All 30 sides from the previous season's Scottish Football League enter including Partick Thistle.
Second round: The 15 winners of the first round are joined by last season's seven lowest placed teams in the SPL not in European competition, including relegated Dundee.
Third round: The 11 winners of the second round are joined by the four SPL sides participating in European competition (Celtic, Motherwell, St Johnstone & Hibernian) and the highest placed SPL finisher not in European competition (Inverness Caledonian Thistle).
Quarter-finals: The 8 winners of the third round play.
Semi-finals: The 4 winners of the quarter-finals play.
Final: The 2 winners of the semi-finals play.

Schedule
First round:      Saturday 3 & Tuesday 6 August 2013
Second round:     Tuesday 27 & Wednesday 28 August 2013
Third round:      Tuesday 24 & Wednesday 25 September 2013
Quarter-finals:   Tuesday 29 & Wednesday 30 October 2013
Semi-finals:      Saturday 1 & Sunday 2 February 2014
Final:            Sunday 16 March 2014

Fixtures & Results

First round
The first round draw was conducted at Hampden Park on Friday 12 July 2013 at 2:30pm.

Second round
The second round draw was conducted at Hampden Park on Wednesday 7 August 2013 at 2:30pm.

Third round
The third round draw was conducted at Easter Road Stadium on Thursday 29 August 2013 at 11:30am.

Quarter-finals
The quarter-final draw was conducted at Hampden Park on Thursday 26 September 2013 at 3:00pm.

Semi-finals
The semi-final draw was conducted at Hampden Park on Thursday 31 October 2013 at 3:00pm.

Final

References

External links
 Scottish Professional Football League – League Cup official website

Scottish League Cup seasons
League Cup
2013–14 in Scottish football cups